is a Japanese voice actress.

Filmography

Video games

Eroge
As Misono Moriya
Akane iro Ni Somaru Saka, Mitsuki Shiina 
ef - the letter tale, Mizuki Hayama / Akane Himura 
Tenshi no Nichiyoubi, Mizuki Hayama 
Hare Tokidoki Otenkiame, Nazuna Kasugai 
Hoshizora e Kakaru Hashi, Hina Sakai 
Hoshizora e Kakaru Hashi AA, Hina Sakai 
Lovely Quest, Minaho Sakuraba 
Manatsu no Yoru no Yuki Monogatari: Midsummer Snow Night, Sakura Haruno (not as Misono Moriya)
Mashiroiro Symphony - Love is pure white, Sana Inui
Making * Lovers, Reina Kanome
Nanairo Kouro, Rachel Windsor 
Navel *Plus, Asuka Watarai & Tsubakiko Munemoto 
Oretachi ni Tsubasa wa Nai, Asuka Watarai
Owaru Sekai to Birthday, Mikaeru Nagoshi 
Renai 0 Kilometer, Hana Kinomoto 
Sekai Seifuku Kanojo, Tsubakiko Munemoto 
World Wide Love! -Sekai Seifuku Kanojo Fandisk, Tsubakiko Munemoto 
Tokeijikake no Ley Line, Ushio Shishigatani 
Your Diary, Kanade Hirosaki

Other games
Agarest Senki Mariage, Piadina 
Arcana Heart 2, Parace L'sia
Arcana Heart 3, Konoha
Criminal Girls, Makoto Hatsurai (Shin)
Izuna: Legend of the Unemployed Ninja, Fuuka
Lairland Story, Somalina 
Marriage Royale, Minami Umeda
Mashiroiro Symphony *mutsu no hana, Sana Inui
Sucre Portable, Futaba Kai

References

External links

Mayumi Yoshida's personal blog 
Mayumi Yoshida's profile at I'm Enterprise 
 Mayumi Yoshida at GamePlaza-Haruka Voice Acting Database 
 Mayumi Yoshida at Hitoshi Doi's Seiyuu Database 
 

1982 births
Living people
Japanese voice actresses
People from Yokohama